Evolution's Child is a 1999 American sci-fi fantasy drama television film directed by Jeffrey Reiner and aired on USA Network. Its teleplay, written by Walter Klenhard, was based on the 1995 book Toys of Glass by Martin Booth. The film starred Ken Olin, Taylor Nichols, Heidi Swedberg, and Jacob Smith.

Tagline
He never knew his father. Because his father died 3,000 years ago.

Plot
After a preserved Bronze Age man is found in Colorado, a woman is mistakenly inseminated with semen extracted from him for DNA research. Years later the child begins to exhibit strange abilities.

Cast
Ken Olin as James Mydell
Taylor Nichols as Brian Cordell
Heidi Swedberg as Elaine Cordell
Jacob Smith as Adam Cordell
Susan Gibney as Beth Lider
Jerry Wasserman as Agent Edmunds
Christopher Gaze as Dr. Lindenhan
Matthew Nielsen as Baby Adam
Wendy Van Riesen as Molly
Robert Moloney as Craig
Kirsten Alter as Dr. Bantrow
Kevin McNulty as Dr. Collard
Simon Longmore	as Bystander
Deryl Hayes as Detective Sheridan
Robert Saunders as Bob
Laura Drummond as Woman
Jenny Mitchell as Teacher
Mark Brandon as TV reporter
D. Neil Mark as Trooper
Santino Barile as Bronze Age man
Sara McIntyre as Nurse
Paul Batten as Dr. Rhodes
Linnea Sharples as Business woman

Awards and nominations

References

External links

1999 television films
1999 films
American science fiction television films
Fantasy television films
American drama television films
USA Network original films
1990s English-language films
Films directed by Jeffrey Reiner
1990s American films